Ljubomir Maraković (Topusko, June 17, 1887 – Zagreb, February 22, 1959) was a Croatian literary critic and historian, and one of the leaders of the Croatian Catholic movement.

He was the first editor of the literary magazine Luč and for a long time the editor of the periodical Hrvatska prosvjeta. He achieved the highest university education from literature in Vienna and later he wrote critics, essays, and works from the literature theory and history, more than thousand in 40 years of his public cultural work. He collaborated on the Croatian Encyclopedia from 1941 to 1945. His engagement was forbidden from Yugoslavian communists after 1945 due to his collaboration with the NDH. In his most important review, New Life (1910), he explains the idea of literary work as a result of synthesis of the national and social interests with the aesthetic categories.
He is considered to be one of the inaugurators of comparative literary approach in Croatian academic writing and lecturing. He highly contributed to introducing writers such as Aldous Huxley, Virginia Woolf, John Galsworthy, Florence Louise Barclay, G. K. Chesterton  and others into Croatian cultural milieu. Among the first academic papers dedicated to Maraković were those written in the 1990s by our literary comparatist and author Helena Peričić. 
Maraković's work was neglected in the period after the Second World War and before 1990s, especially because of his Catholic orientation.

See also
 Ivan Merz
 Antun Mahnić
 Josip Stadler
 Ivo Protulipac

Sources
Maraković, Ljubomir at enciklopedija.hr 
Maraković, Ljubomir at Leksikon Marina Držića 

 Helena Peričić, "Ljubomir Maraković, zanemareni katolički kritičar, i engleska književnost"  /Ljubomir Maraković, neglected Catholic critic, and English literature", Croatica, Zagreb, 30, 2000, 49–50, 109–125.
 Helena Peričić, "Ljubomir Maraković", in: Helena Peričić, Posrednici engleske književnosti u hrvatskoj književnoj kritici u razdoblju od 194. do 1940. godine /Mediators of English literature in Croatian criticism between 1914 and 1940/, Hrvatsko filološko društvo, Zagreb, 2003, 239–255.

Croatian writers
Croatian Roman Catholics
Catholic philosophers
Croatian literary historians
Croatian literary critics
20th-century Croatian philosophers
1959 deaths
1887 births
Burials at Mirogoj Cemetery